Emily Wilson  (born December 15, 2004) is an American rhythmic gymnast from New York City who competed with the Team USA senior group at the Pan American Gymnastics Championships, as well as the 2021 & 2022 Rhythmic Gymnastics World Championships.

Bio
Emily was born on December 15th, 2004 in New York City to Angela and Brian Wilson. She graduated from PMP Academy in 2020. She currently attends John Jay College of Criminal Justice and is majoring in Business & Finance.  She trains out of the North Shore Rhythmic Gymnastics Center. Her coaches are Natalia Klimouk and Margarita Mamzina.

National Competition Results

International Competition Results

References

Living people
2004 births
American female artistic gymnasts
Female gymnasts
Female athletes
American rhythmic gymnasts
21st-century American women